Joedy Gardner (born June 23, 1935) is an American college basketball coach. He was the head coach at West Virginia University from 1974 to 1978 and at Northern Arizona University from 1978 to 1981.

References

1935 births
Living people
American men's basketball coaches
Iowa Hawkeyes men's basketball coaches
Junior college men's basketball coaches in the United States
Northern Arizona Lumberjacks men's basketball coaches
West Virginia Mountaineers men's basketball coaches
West Virginia Mountaineers men's basketball players
American men's basketball players
Guards (basketball)